The Lady of the Camellias (Italian:La signora delle camelie) is a 1915 Italian historical drama film directed by Gustavo Serena and starring Francesca Bertini. It is an adaptation of Alexandre Dumas, fils' novel The Lady of the Camellias.

The film's art direction was by Alfredo Manzi.

Cast
 Carlo Benetti
 Olga Benetti as Madame Duvernoy 
 Francesca Bertini as Margherita Gauthier 
 Antonio Cruichi as Duval padre 
 Camillo De Riso 
 Tina Ceccaci Renaldi
 Gustavo Serena as Armando Duval

References

Bibliography 
 Moliterno, Gino. The A to Z of Italian Cinema. Scarecrow Press, 2009.

External links 
 

1915 films
1910s historical drama films
Italian historical drama films
Italian drama films
1910s Italian-language films
Italian silent feature films
Films based on Camille
Films directed by Gustavo Serena
Italian black-and-white films
1915 drama films
Silent historical drama films